Kadi is a town and a municipality in Mehsana district in the Indian state of Gujarat.

General information

 Geographic Location : .
 Weather : Normal
 Total Numbers of Villages : 120
 Population : Total - 260934, Men - 135723, Women - 125211
 Literacy : Average - 65.8%, Men - 78.55%, Women - 52.02%
 Crops : Sorghum, Cotton, Wheat, Rayado, Cumin seed etc.
 Domestic Animals : Cows, buffaloes, camels, donkeys, goats etc.
 Minerals : Oil & Natural Gas
 Railway : 15 km
 Roads : State Highways, Panchayat Roads etc.
 Industries : Cotton processing, Cotton seed processing, Cotton oil Refineries, Ceramic industry and many more.Big companies like Somany Tiles, Cera Sanitary, Johnson Controls, Many other companies are located here
 Tourist Points: Meladi mata temple, Malhavrav Fort, Umiya mata temple, Narmada Canal diversion, Municipal Garden, Malji Bhagat ni Vav, Oghadnath Mahadev temple, Dasiya pir dargah, maneksha bawa dargah, Balapir bava ki dargah, Thol Lake is there which is 22 km away from kadi, known as a bird sanctuary Thol Lake. Many out of countries birds used to come in winter at thol lake
 Schools : Bhavkunj School, Noble School Vidhya Mandir Primary and Higher Secondary School, Sheth R.H.High school & R.C.Patel higher secondary school, Merda-Adraj, Sarva Vidhyalaya Kelavani Mandal, Adarsh Vidhyalay, Zaveri High School, Little Angels School.
 Hospital : Bhagyoday Hospital, Devansh icu and medical hospital,  Block Health Office, Sneh Children Hospital And Nicu, Rhythm Medical And Heart Hospital, Maruti Hospital And Test Tube Baby Centre, Krishna Hospital.
 Green vegetable market : In kadi there is a wide green vegetable market and starts trading by early morning and mostly stops before noon, almost green vegetable seller come from nearer villages and sell in bulk qty with lower price. Lemon (LIMBU) is available here in large qty at lower price, because around villages have too much plants for lemon.
 Middle class business center : This city is very popular for shopping cloths as well as jewelry (Ornaments) while any festival or wedding time arrived.
 local news paper + State/India level newspaper also available
 Online Services: KadiBuddy App - KadiBuddy Private Limited provides online delivery services and makes easy for new travelers to know nearby stores and services on their smartphones 

Kurukshetra, (wed)
All the best, (fri)
Weekend news, (thu)
Sanpark shetu, (sat)
Jayraaj, (sun)

Gallery

References

External links

 Yavteshwar Mahadev Temple, Kadi: https://web.archive.org/web/20140303133508/http://www.yavteshwarmahadev.org/
 Information on Kadi & its tourism: https://web.archive.org/web/20140303183341/http://kadi.gujarat-india.org/
 Sarva Vidhyalay, Kadi: http://kadiuniversity.com
 Web development and Training Company, Kadi: http://www.seecoding.com
 Bhagyoday Hospital, Kadi: https://www.nhp.gov.in/hospital/bhagyoday-general-hospital-mahesana-gujarat

Cities and towns in Mehsana district